The Azad Kashmir Regular Force (AKRF), formerly known as the Kashmir Liberation Forces, were the irregular forces of Azad Kashmir until 1948, when they were taken over by the government of Pakistan and converted into a regular force. In this form, the unit became part of the country's paramilitary forces, operating out of the nominally self-governing territory of Azad Jammu and Kashmir.
The AKRF was altered from a functioning paramilitary force and merged into the Pakistan Army as an infantry regiment following the Indo-Pakistani War of 1971. 

A majority of the Pakistani troops who were deployed to infiltrate the Indian-administered state of Jammu and Kashmir during Operation Gibraltar in August 1965 were in service with the AKRF. Its failure led to the Indo-Pakistani War of 1965.

Name
Sardar Ibrahim Khan, the president of the Azad Kashmir provisional government in 1947–1948, called the force Azad Army, which was the term adopted by Christopher Snedden. Other names used were Azad forces, Azad militias and Azad irregulars.

Within Pakistan, they were called the Kashmir Liberation Forces during the course of the First Kashmir War. Sources state that they were "redesignated" as the Azad Kashmir Regular Forces, but do not specify the date.

The most likely date of the redesignation is near the end of 1948, when the Pakistan government is said to have taken command of the Azad Forces. Pakistan also reorganised the forces into "32 battalions of serious military potential ready to take over the position of the Pakistan Army [in the Kashmir territory].
The conversion of the irregulars into regular forces was the key stumbling block for the resolution of the Kashmir dispute.

History

Azad Army 

The 'Azad Army', so called by the Azad Kashmir provisional government, was made up of the former soldiers of the British Indian Army from the regions that later became Azad Kashmir (mostly Poonch, but some also from Mirpur and Muzaffarabad). They were originally recruited for the British Indian Army during the World War II by Khan Muhammad Khan of Bagh, who served as the recruitment officer for the British war effort.
Christopher Snedden estimates that 50,000 youth joined the Army during the war, calling themselves "Punjabi Musalmans" and serving in the Punjab Regiment(s). Demobilised after the war, they returned to their home districts, where they grew increasingly dissatisfied with the living conditions. During and after the Partition of India, the All-India Muslim League working from across the border and the local Muslim Conference which was allied to the Muslim League, channeled their disaffection into a call for accession to Pakistan. Sardar Ibrahim Khan, the Muslim Conference MLA from Bagh, and Sardar Abdul Qayyum Khan, a local zamindar and himself a World War veteran, were the key leaders.

Sardar Ibrahim escaped to West Pakistan towards the end of August 1947 and established a base for the rebellion in Murree. By 12 September, he also got Pakistan government into supporting their effort, providing arms and military leadership. A military headquarters called GHQ Azad was established in Gujrat staffed by former Indian National Army officers living in Pakistan, which provided higher military direction to the rebels that made up the 'Azad Army'.

Military operations started on 6 October 1947. Jammu and Kashmir State Forces, which were thinly stretched along the border, withdrew to their garrisons in towns (Poonch, Kotli, Mirpur and Bhimber) and the Azad forces took control of the border areas. The rebels now outnumbered the State Forces (of about 9,000 men) many times over. While this was ongoing, Pakistan launched a tribal invasion of Kashmir on 22 October, via Muzaffarabad, which initiated the First Kashmir War. The Maharaja of Jammu and Kashmir acceded to India in return for military support, and India air-lifted troops for the defence of the Kashmir Valley. From this point onwards, the Azad forces, Pashtun tribes and other interested militias from Pakistan fought the Jammu and Kashmir State Forces and the Indian Army, till a ceasefire was called at the end of December 1948. The regular Pakistan Army also participated in some of the key battles and supported the rebels from the rear.

Kashmir War 1947–48 
What began as a revolt by young rebels and ex-servicemen turned out to be a big setback for tripartite alliance of Maharaja of Jammu and Kashmir, Indian Government, and the remnants of outgoing British colonial authorities still in control of India and in partial control of Pakistan. To quote the words of Pakistan Army's Official Portal "They liberated over 34,000 square miles of the State's territory that is now called Azad Jammu and Kashmir and Northern Areas." 

AKRF began its struggle as Armed Militia known as Lashkar, Ghazis and Jathas. As the volunteers swelled the ranks and files, a command structure was established to control these paramilitary force of vigilantes. Being well aware of aspirations of the people of State, Pakistani Government under the leadership of Governor General M A Jinnah and Prime Minister Liaquat Ali Khan decided to support the Lashkars. British C in C of its Army, General Frank Messervy refused to obey the instructions of M A Jinnah. However, AKRF took Muzaffarabad by 13 October 1947, Mirpur by 25 November 1947 and Jhangar in December 1947. India meanwhile managed to get the Instrument of accession signed by the Hindu Maharaja of state and landed its Military forces in the valley using massive air lifts. Fierce fighting continued for over a year but AKRF with the assistance of Pakistani tribals and regular army managed to capture Districts of Mirpur, Bhimber, Kotli, Bagh, Rawlakot, Muzaffarabad and Neelum. A total of 2633 all ranks of the regiment died during the war. Naik Saif Ali Janjua of 5th & 18th Battalion of AK Regt (Haider Dil) & (Al Saif) was awarded  Hilal-e-Kashmir at Mendhar sector of Jammu. He was commanding a platoon at Pir Kalewa feature and died on 25 Oct 1948 during the battle of Pir Kalewa which was attacked by 5 Infantry Brigade of Indian Army.

Indo-Pak War 1965 
In wartime operations, the AKRF was part of the Order of Battle of the Pakistan Army, in which it was involved in 1965 Operation Gibraltar. All of the AKRF battalions were part of the 12th Infantry Division (Pakistan) that carried out Operation Gibraltar as well as defended Azad Kashmir. Subedar (later Honorary Captain) Muhammad Israel Khan of 39th AK Regt was then part of Ghazi Battalion. He was awarded second Sitara E Jurat for his bravery. He had previously won an SJ in 1948 during the Battle of Paran Hill at the foothills of Pir Badesar in 1948. During the same operation one of the Company Commanders of 21 Azad Kashmir Regiment, Major Malik Munawar Khan Awan, became famous for his heroic action and occupation of Indian Garrison of Rajauri while commanding Ghaznavi Force during Operation Gibraltar. Later Major Munawar was awarded "Sitara e Jurat" for gallantry and the title of "King of Rajouri" by President Field Marshal Muhammad Ayub Khan.

Indo-Pak War 1971 and subsequent operations in Kashmir 
The Azad Kashmir Regular Forces fought in the 1971 war and then in 1972 when the 9th Azad Kashmir Battalion defended Chakpatra and Leepa Valley against a larger Indian force composed of several regular battalions.  This particular battalion was first led in 1948 by Lt Colonel Ghulam Rasul Raja-Sitara-e-Jurrat (1948), Military Cross (WWII). During the Battle of Leepa Valley the 9th AK Battalion with 25 Mountain Regiment Artillery distinguished itself under the leadership of Lt Colonel Haq Nawaz Kyani, SJ and Bar, who died leading the battalion from the front. The Company Commander of B Coy called for artillery fire upon their own position while being over run by the enemy; in doing this they repulsed the enemy attack.

Merger into the Pakistan Army

Originally considered a paramilitary force, the Azad Kashmir formally became an infantry regiment of the Pakistan Army in 1972 and was renamed the Azad Kashmir Regiment

Famous members
Malik Munawar Khan Awan

See also
Azad Kashmir Regiment
Operation Gibraltar
Ghaznavi Force

Notes

References

Bibliography
 
 
 
 
 
 
 
 
 
 

Former paramilitary forces of Pakistan
Military in Azad Kashmir